Pura Vida is the eighth album by the Spanish alternative metal band Hamlet. The sound is more aggressive than Syberia. It was recorded by Sergio Marcos and Sonia Robles in Sonora Estudios (Madrid, Spain); mixed by Colin Richardson in Miloco Studios (London, UK) and mastered by Alan Douches in West West Side Music (New York, USA). Is the last album with guitarist Pedro Sánchez.

Track listing 
 Arruinando nuestra vida
 El Diablo
 En mi nombre
 Bajo su cuerpo
 Fronteras de tu mente
 Salva mi honor
 Acaba con el poder
 Vanidad
 Único plan
 Miénteme

Members 
J. Molly - Vocals
Luis Tárraga - Lead guitar
Pedro Sánchez - Rhythm guitar
Álvaro Tenorio - Bass
Paco Sánchez - Drums

References 
Zona-Zero.net Review in Zona-Zero
Review in The Metal Circus

2006 albums
Hamlet (band) albums
Locomotive Music albums